The Carlos Palanca Memorial Awards for Literature winners in the year 1958 (rank, title of winning entry, name of author).


English division
Short story
First prize: "La Vidal" by Nick Joaquin
Second prize: "Lilies of Yesterday" by Lilia Pablo Amansec
Third prize: "The Dwarf Pinetree" by Florencio Garcia

One-act play
First prize: "Versions of the Dawn" by Azucena Grajo Uranza
Second prize: "Legend of the Filipino Guitar" by Wilfrido D. Nolledo
Third prize: "Justice is But a Seeming" by S.R. Sievert

Filipino (Tagalog) division
Short story in Filipino
First prize: "Ang Mangingisda" by Ponciano B. Pineda
Second prize: "Mahaba ang Daang Bakal" by Simplicio Bisa
Third prize: "Lakas" by Pedro S. Dandan

One-act play in Filipino
First prize: "Muntinlupa" by Amado V. Hernandez
Second prize: "Kamatayan sa Loob ng Isang Kuta" by Fernando L. Samonte
Third prize: "Bahid ng Dugo sa Mukha ng Buwan" by Pedro S. Dandan

More winners by year

References
 

1958
1958 literary awards